National Timber Group (NTG) is one of the largest independent timber distribution and processing groups in the UK. The group has 60 processing and branch/distribution sites across the UK providing nationwide coverage, and employs 1450 people.

Formation 
The group was formed in 2018 by specialist private equity investment firm Cairngorm Capital through the acquisition of Thornbridge, NYTimber, Rembrand and Arnold Laver. The CEO is Rob Barclay.

NTG acquired Scotia Roofing & Building Supplies and Glow Insulation - both Rembrand subsidiary companies - in June 2019, the assets of Cotswold Manufacturing  in November 2019, independent timber merchant Hymor Timber in February 2021, and Orchard Timber Products in November 2021. In September 2022 SV Timber was acquired.

Four new brands - National Timber Systems, Timberworld.co.uk, Intelligent Door Solutions and Alco Timber - have been developed within the group.

Through the companies, NTG's customer base includes carpenters and joiners, housebuilders and building contractors. It is a supplier to large-scale infrastructure projects.

Group turnover is over £350 million, and there are 1450 employees. There are 60 processing and branch/distribution sites from the north of Scotland to London and the south west of England, providing customers with high quality timber, panel, decorative surfaces and engineered wood products supported by comprehensive timber knowledge and expertise.

NTG is a member of the Timber Trade Federation and is listed on Companies House.

Locations 

 Aberdeen
 Alfreton
 Ayr
 Birmingham
 Borehamwood
 Bradford
 Bristol
 Brompton on Swale
 Cannock
 Cambridge
 Coventry
 Croydon
 Dalbeattie
 Darlington
 Dumbarton
 Dumfries
 Dundee
 Edinburgh
 Elgin
 Forfar
 Glasgow
 Glenrothes
 Grangemouth
 Hebburn, Newcastle
 Ilkeston
 Inverness
 Inverurie
 Irvine
 Kidderminster
 Kingston upon Hull
 Leeds
 Leicester
 Livingston
 Manchester
 Middlesbrough
 Milton Keynes
 Motherwell
 Newton Stewart
 North Shields
 Northallerton
 Oban
 Oldbury
 Peterborough
 Rainham, Kent
 Reading
 Richmond, North Yorkshire
 Sheffield
 Selkirk
 Skye
 Stirling
 Stoke on Trent
 Sunderland
 Thornaby
 Thurso

References

External links 

 National Timber Group website

Construction